TIM-600 was an important PC computer system in the TIM series of microcomputers from Mihajlo Pupin Institute-Belgrade, developed from 1987 to 1988 (see ref.Lit. #1, #2 and #6).  It was based on the Intel microprocessor types 80386 and 80387. It has word-length of 32 bits, basic cycle time of 20 MHz and operating system Unix V.3. The TIM-600 computer system was presented at the Munich International Computer Exhibition in September 1988.

System specifications
TIM-600 architecture was based on three system buses (32, 16 and 8 bits respectively). The CPU performs 5,000,000 simple operations per second. Primary memory RAM had a maximum capacity of 8 x 2 MB. There were a maximum of eight TIM terminals or other equipment units connected by RS-232C. Centronics types interface was used for the line printers. Also, there were possibilities for the connections of two hard disks as well as the magnetic cassettes and diskettes.

Software
The TIM-600 uses the programming languages C++, Fortran, Cobol, BASIC and Pascal. Database management was performed by Informix and Oracle software.

Applications
The TIM-600 computer system was used for business data processing in many offices in Serbia, for example in public, health, and scientific organizations; for process automation in industrial production; in road traffic control; in some banks; for military and government services, etc.

See also
 Mihajlo Pupin Institute
 Personal computer

References

Microcomputers
IBM PC compatibles
Mihajlo Pupin Institute